The Heibeeksköpfe in the Harz Mountains of central Germany are a double summit with a maximum height of , near Bad Lauterberg in the unincorporated area of Harz in the district of Göttingen in Lower Saxony.

Location 
The Heibeeksköpfe rise in the South Harz in the Harz Nature Park about 1.5 km (as the crow flies) north-northwest of the railway station at Bad Lauterberg. They separate the Lutter tributary of Heibeek, after which they are named, to the west and south, from the Lutter to the east. Their two summits – the Großer (465.2 m) and Kleiner Heibeekskopf (440.1 m) – are oriented north-to-south and are about 460 metres apart. On the eastern flank of both peaks is the  Augenquelle spring that drains into the Lutter.

Hiking 
Just 800 metres northwest of the Großer Heibeekskopf and thus in the direction of the Scheffeltalsköpfe lies the crosstracks of Knollenkreuz (ca. ; ), which is checkpoint no. 152 in the Harzer Wandernadel hiking network; the checkpoint box is located right next to the refuge hut called the Hentschelköte. The crossing is on the footpath from Bad Lauterberg to the highest mountain in the South Harz, the Großer Knollen.

References 

Hills of the Harz
Hills of Lower Saxony
Osterode am Harz